Eurypteryx falcata is a moth of the  family Sphingidae. It is known from Papua New Guinea.

Description
The forewing upperside has a dark brown triangle with its base along the costa, where there are several small paler spots. The apex of this triangle is directed towards the inner margin. There is a darker area around the white discal spot. The forewing underside has a round blotch restricted to the disc of the wing. The hindwing upperside has a dark brown median band and the hindwing underside has three dark transverse lines.

References

Eurypteryx
Moths described in 1922